Guayania is a genus of South American flowering plants in the family Asteraceae.

 Species
 Guayania bulbosa (Aristeg.) R.M.King & H.Rob.
 Guayania cerasifolia (Sch.Bip. ex Baker) R.M.King & H.Rob.
 Guayania crassicaulis (Steyerm.) R.M.King & H.Rob.	
 Guayania penninervata (Wurdack) R.M.King & H.Rob.
 Guayania roupalifolia (B.L.Rob.) R.M.King & H.Rob.
 Guayania yaviana (Lasser & Maguire) R.M.King & H.Rob.

References

Asteraceae genera
Eupatorieae
Flora of South America